Ri Kwang-il (born 13 April 1988) is a North Korean international football player. He played for Sobaeksu in the DPR Korea League.

Career
In summer 2009 together with other two players from Sobaeksu, An Il-bom and Myong Cha-hyon, he moved to Serbia and signed a one-year contract with FK Radnički Kragujevac. They played in one of the Serbian third levels, the Serbian League West. After playing twice in the first six months, he was dropped by Radnički coach Vlado Čapljić for the second half of the season, and he was loaned to another club from same city, FK Erdoglija Kragujevac for the last six months.

He has been a part of the North Korea national football team since 2010, and was filled in the squad at the 2011 Asian Cup as a non-used substitute. He was part of the North Korean squad at the 2013 EAFF East Asian Cup too. In 2014, he finally made his debut for the North Korean national team. He was called for the 2010 Asian Games, 2015 EAFF East Asian Cup and 2015 AFC Asian Cup.

Earlier, he was part of North Korea squad at the 2007 FIFA U-20 World Cup.

Honours
Radnički Kragujevac
Serbian League West: 2009–10

April 25
DPR Korea Premier Football League: 2015

References

External links

Ri Kwang-il at DPRKFootball

1988 births
Living people
Sportspeople from Pyongyang
North Korean footballers
Association football goalkeepers
Sobaeksu Sports Club players
April 25 Sports Club players
FK Radnički 1923 players
North Korea youth international footballers
Asian Games competitors for North Korea
North Korea international footballers
Footballers at the 2010 Asian Games
2011 AFC Asian Cup players
2015 AFC Asian Cup players
North Korean expatriate footballers
North Korean expatriate sportspeople in Serbia
Expatriate footballers in Serbia